Dowrog Common (Welsh: Comin Dowrog) is a Site of Special Scientific Interest (or SSSI) in Pembrokeshire, South Wales. It has been designated as a Site of Special Scientific Interest since January 1954 in an attempt to protect its fragile biological elements.

Features
This site is designated due to its biological qualities. SSSIs in Wales have been notified for a total of 142 different animal species and 191 different plant species.

This site has eight special features:
  Fen
  Swamp
  Marshy Grassland
  Wet Heath
  Dry Heath
  Floating Water Plantain
  Rare Plants
  Small Red Damselfly

See also
List of Sites of Special Scientific Interest in Pembrokeshire

References

External links
Natural Resources Wales website

Sites of Special Scientific Interest in Pembrokeshire